The women's tournament in volleyball at the 2020 Summer Olympics was the 15th edition of the event at an Olympic Games, organised by the world's governing body, the FIVB, in conjunction with the IOC. It was held in Tokyo, Japan from 25 July to 8 August 2021.

It was originally scheduled to take place from 26 July to 9 August 2020, but due to the COVID-19 pandemic, the IOC and the Tokyo 2020 Organising Committee announced on 24 March 2020 that the 2020 Summer Olympics would be delayed to 2021. Because of this pandemic, the games were played behind closed doors.

The United States won their first gold after finishing runners-up three times with a 3–0 win over Brazil. Serbia won the bronze medal with a victory over South Korea.

The medals for the competition were presented by Nenad Lalović, IOC Executive Board Member; Serbia, and the medalists' bouquets were presented by Ary Graça, FIVB President; Brazil.

Competition schedule

Qualification

Pools composition
Teams were seeded following the serpentine system according to their FIVB World Ranking as of 29 September 2019. FIVB reserved the right to seed the hosts as head of pool A regardless of the World Ranking. Rankings are shown in brackets except the hosts who ranked 7th.

Rosters

Venue

Format
The preliminary round was a competition between the twelve teams divided into two pools of six teams. The teams competed in a single round-robin format. The four highest ranked teams in each group advanced to the knockout stage (quarter-finals). The sixth placed teams in each pool were ranked eleventh in this competition. The fifth placed teams in each pool were ranked ninth.

The knockout stage followed the single-elimination format. The losers of the quarter-finals were eliminated and ranked fifth. The quarterfinal winners played in the semi-finals. The winners of the semi-finals competed for gold medals and the losers played for bronze medals.

Pool standing procedure
In order to establish the ranking of teams after the group stage, the following criteria should be implemented:

 Number of matches won
 Match points
 Sets ratio
 Points ratio
 Result of the last match between the tied teams

Match won 3–0 or 3–1: 3 match points for the winner, 0 match points for the loser
Match won 3–2: 2 match points for the winner, 1 match point for the loser

Referees
The following referees were selected for the tournament.

 Hernán Casamiquela
 Paulo Turci
 Liu Jiang
 Denny Cespedes
 Fabrice Collados
 Daniele Rapisarda
 Shin Muranaka
 Sumie Myoi
 Luis Macias
 Wojciech Maroszek
 Evgeny Makshanov
 Vladimir Simonović
 Juraj Mokrý
 Kang Joo-hee
 Susana Rodríguez
 Hamid Al-Rousi
 Patricia Rolf

Preliminary round
All times are Japan Standard Time (UTC+09:00).
The top four teams in each pool qualified for the quarter-finals.

Pool A

Pool B

Knockout stage
The first ranked teams of both pools played against the fourth ranked teams of the other pool. The second ranked teams faced the second or third ranked teams of the other pool, determined by drawing of lots. The drawing of lots was held after the last match in the preliminary round.  As it happened at the 2008 Beijing Olympic Games, the drawing ended up with the 2nd ranked teams facing each other, and the 3rd ranked teams playing against each other.

Bracket

Quarter-finals

Semi-finals
Tandara Caixeta of Brazil was suspended from the semi-final match to South Korea after a positive out-of-competition drug test for Enobosarm.

Bronze medal match

Gold medal match

Statistics leaders
Only players whose teams advanced to the semifinals are ranked.

Best scorers

Best spikers

Best blockers

Best servers

Best diggers

Best setters

Best receivers

Final ranking

Medalists

Awards
The awards were announced on 8 August 2021.

See also
Volleyball at the 2020 Summer Olympics – Men's tournament

References

External links
Official website

Volleyball at the 2020 Summer Olympics
Women's events at the 2020 Summer Olympics